Orban, also known as Urban (died 1453), was an iron founder and engineer from Brassó, Transylvania, in the Kingdom of Hungary (today Brașov, Romania), who cast large-calibre artillery for the Ottoman siege of Constantinople in 1453.

Orban was Hungarian, according to most modern authors, while some scholars also mention his potential German ancestry. Alternative theories suggest he had Wallachian roots. Laonikos Chalkokondyles used the term Dacian to describe him.

He had offered his services to the Byzantines in 1452, a year before the Ottomans attacked the city, but the Byzantine emperor Constantine XI could not afford Orban's high salary nor did the Byzantines possess the materials necessary for constructing such a large siege cannon. Orban then left Constantinople and approached the Ottoman sultan Mehmed II, who was preparing to besiege the city. Claiming that his weapon could blast 'the walls of Babylon itself', Orban was given abundant funds and materials by the sultan. Orban managed to build the giant gun within three months at Adrianople, whence sixty oxen dragged it to Constantinople. Orban also produced other, smaller cannons used by the Turkish siege forces.

Bombarding technology similar to Orban's had first been developed for the Hungarian Army. It rose in popularity during the early 1400s all over western Europe, transforming siege warfare. Examples of pieces similar to Orban's productions like the Faule Mette, Dulle Griet, Mons Meg and the Pumhart von Steyr are still extant from the period. Orban, along with an entire crew, was probably killed during the siege when one of his cannons exploded, which was not an unusual occurrence during that time.

In popular culture 
 Master Orban was played by Burhanettin Üskan in the 1951 Turkish film, İstanbul'un Fethi.
 Erdoğan Aydemir played Orban in the 2012 film Fetih 1453. In the film, Orban makes a sketch for the Doge of Genoa (Ali Ersin Yenar), but the Doge isn't interested in his sketch. Orban has an adopted daughter named Era (Dilek Serbest) who has a romantic relationship with Ulubatlı Hasan (İbrahim Çelikkol).
 Master Orban is played by Tansu Biçer in the 2020 Netflix production, Rise of Empires: Ottoman.
 In the video game Europa Universalis IV, the Ottoman nation can get a bonus unique to it early in the game, called the "Guns of Urban", which will help it greatly when besieging enemy forts.

References

Sources 

 

1453 deaths
15th-century Hungarian people
Hungarian engineers
Hungarian inventors
People from Brașov
Year of birth unknown
Fall of Constantinople
15th-century inventors